RER D is one of the five lines in the  (English: Regional Express Network), a hybrid commuter rail and rapid transit system serving Paris, France and its suburbs. The  line crosses the region from north to south, with all trains serving a group of stations in central Paris, before branching out towards the ends of the line.

The line connects Creil in the north to Melun and Malesherbes in the south, passing through the heart of Paris. Line D also links Gare du Nord with Gare de Lyon via Châtelet-Les Halles.

Opened in stages from 1987 to 1996, it is the longest RER line by distance, and the busiest SNCF line in France, carrying up to 615,000 passengers and operating 466 trains each working day.

Almost all of the line is located in the Île-de-France region, that is, within the jurisdiction of the Île-de-France Mobilités, but some of the branch lines at the north and south of the line are outside the region.

Chronology
 27 September 1987: Inauguration of Line D. Operated Villiers-le-Bel – Gare du Nord – Châtelet-Les Halles, using the Line B Tunnel to Châtelet–Les Halles
 1988: Extension north towards Goussainville.
 September 1990: Extension north towards Orry-la-Ville.
 September 1995: Inauguration of "Interconnexion Sud-Est". The line is extended from Châtelet to Melun and La Ferté-Alais then Malesherbes (the following year, 1996) in the south of Paris.
 25 January 1998: New station, Stade de France – Saint-Denis, opened. Located between Gare du Nord and St-Denis.
 29 January 2007: First renovated Z 20500 stock in service.
 19 March 2008: Start of the "D Maintenant" programme by Guillaume Pepy, the president of SNCF.
 14 December 2008: Reduced "Interconnexion Nord-Sud" service, with 8 interconnected trains per hour.
 Late 2009: End of the "D Maintenant" programme.
 7 December 2011: Start of studies for the doubling of the Châtelet-Gare du Nord tunnel.
 15 December 2013: New station, Créteil-Pompadour, opened and replaced Villeneuve-Prairie.

History

Conception
Initially, the "métro régional", the ancestor to the RER, was conceived of three lines, one going from east to west (the future RER A), a new line built from existing lines (the future RER C), the extension of the Ligne de Sceaux and with its interconnection with an SNCF line, along with a supplementary interconnected north–south (the future RER D). The operation of renovating "les Halles" gave the occasion to build Châtelet-Les Halles with a cut-and-cover method, in order to reduce costs.

 Initially the new RER D was meant to share tracks with the RER A between Paris-Gare de Lyon and Châtelet-Les Halles. But RATP, the company who runs the RER A, objected to such an operation as the number of passengers using the RER A was growing and required running extra trains on the RER A. It was decided instead that each line should have its own platforms, with RER A at the Gare de Lyon having its tracks at a lower level of the underground station and the future RER D on the upper level. The RER D at the Gare de Lyon has four tracks and, being above the RER A tracks, this allows "platform to platform" transfers vertically, a Japanese invention.

Inauguration
On 27 September 1987, the RER D was officially created, by extending existing suburban trains from Villiers-le-Bel to Gare du Nord, towards Châtelet-Les Halles. At Châtelet-Les Halles, the RER D terminated on the three central tracks, already built from the conception of Châtelet-Les Halles station.

In 1988, existing suburban trains terminating at Goussainville now integrate with the RER D. On the same year, the first bi-mode Z 20500 trains are in service. They were initially composed of 4 cars until the north–south interconnection was inaugurated in 1995, when they became 5-car trains (where they're coupled to make 10-car trains).

In September 1990, the RER D again extended north to Orry-la-Ville. At the same time, one-man operation started on the RER D.

Central tunnel opening

In 1996, the RER D was extended south from La Ferté-Alais to Malesherbes. On 15 January 1998 for the 1998 FIFA World Cup, Stade de France – Saint-Denis station opened, in order to serve the Stade de France.

A high number of incidents, from a social and service point of view, have brought the term "RER poubelle" ("RER trash" in French), often used by its users, and even its staff. Assaults are frequent and unpunctuality is the highest in the Transilien network, with the number of late trains going from 9.9% to 14.1% between 1994 and 1995.

Enhancements

On 22 November 2006 the STIF approved a master plan for the RER D in order to establish short, mid and long-term goals for its reliability.

On 29 January 2007, the first renovated Z 20500 train was presented, the first of 137 trains. Renovated trains feature a new blue livery, uniform 2+3 seats, new lighting and new floor covering. The renovation programme cost over €100 million.

Delays
 The RER D is often seen in Paris as the most unpunctual railway line in the RER network. This unpunctuality is partially due to the tunnel the RER B and RER D lines share between Châtelet–Les Halles and Gare du Nord, where even a small delay of a few seconds on either lines can cause catastrophic delays and trains to be cancelled. The effects of this mean regular commuters of the RER D are used to trains being cancelled or late daily.

Service nomenclature
Like all other lines of the RER system, every train is assigned a four letter code, called a name of service or a mission code. Train timetables, passenger information display systems and the front of the trains all display names of services.

New system
The first letter corresponds to the final destination, which is essentially the train's terminus.
 A: Gare du Nord
 B: Malesherbes
 D: Gare de Lyon (Underground)
 E: Saint-Denis
 F: Goussainville
 J: Juvisy
 K: Évry – Courcouronnes Centre
 L: Orry-la-Ville-Coye
 M: Châtelet–Les Halles
 N: Combs-la-Ville – Quincy
 P: Créteil-Pompadour or Gare de Lyon (Surface)
 R: Corbeil-Essonnes
 S: Creil
 T: La Ferté-Alais
 U: Stade de France – Saint-Denis
 V: Villiers-le-Bel – Gonesse – Arnouville
 X: Villeneuve-Saint-Georges
 Z: Melun

The second letter indicates the stations served by the train in the section spanning from Gare de Lyon to Villeneuve-Saint-Georges.
 A: Stops only at Maisons-Alfort – Alfortville and Créteil-Pompadour
 I: Express between Gare de Lyon and Villeneuve-Saint-Georges
 O: All stops on this section
 U: Stops only at Maisons-Alfort – Alfortville.

The third letter indicates the branch the train takes.
 C: Branch from Gare de Lyon to Combs-la-Ville – Quincy
 P: Branch from Gare de Lyon to Corbeil-Essonnes via Évry – Courcouronnes Centre (plateau)
 S: Branch from Corbeil-Essonnes to Melun (littoral)
 V: Branch from Juvisy to Corbeil-Essonnes, or even Malesherbes or Melun, via Ris-Orangis (valley)

The fourth letter indicates whether the train would serve Viry-Châtillon or not, and it also indicates the direction the train is running.
 A: This train runs from the south part to the north part and stops at Viry-Châtillon.
 E: This train does not stop at Viry-Châtillon (irrespective of direction).
 O: This train runs from the north part to the south part and stops at Viry-Châtillon.

Old system
The old system used until 2008 was very different that the last letter did not indicate whether the train would serve Viry-Châtillon or not, and the first letters for Creil, Orry-la-Ville-Coye and Villeneuve-Saint-Georges were different.

First letter: destination of the train
 A: Gare du Nord
 B: Malesherbes
 C: Creil
 D: Gare de Lyon
 F: Goussainville
 H: Orry-la-Ville-Coye
 J: Juvisy
 M: Châtelet–Les Halles
 N: Combs-la-Ville – Quincy
 Q: Villeneuve-Saint-Georges
 R: Corbeil-Essonnes
 T: La Ferté-Alais
 U: Stade de France – Saint-Denis
 V: Villiers-le-Bel – Gonesse – Arnouville
 Z: Melun

Third letter: the branch
 C: Branch from Gare de Lyon to Combs-la-Ville – Quincy
 P: Branch from Gare de Lyon to Corbeil-Essonnes via Évry – Courcouronnes Centre (plateau)
 L: Branch from Gare de Lyon to Orry-la-Ville
 S: Branch from Corbeil-Essonnes to Melun
 V: Branch from Juvisy to Corbeil-Essonnes, or even Malesherbes or Melun, via Ris-Orangis (valley)

Incidents
On 20 September 2003, an unusual incident occurred near Villeneuve-Triage station. A southbound train stopped at 18:50 on the central track near the station due to an incident. Passengers aboard were invited to step off the train by the left, as track 2M has been neutralised by the regulators. However, due to a misuse of the alarm signal by nervous passengers, some doors opened on the right.

Thankfully, no one was injured. This near miss, filmed by a passenger with a mobile phone, was broadcast the night of the incident, and created a large controversy.

On 9 July 2004, an alleged anti-semitic assault provoked a public and political reaction, with immediate declarations from the Ministry of the Interior Dominique de Villepin and the President of France Jacques Chirac. However, the allegations were proven false after the investigation, as the person behind the assault suffered from pathological lying. The event provoked a controversy on the treatment of information by the media.

See also
 List of stations of the Paris Métro
 List of stations of the Paris RER

References

External links

English 
 RATP's English-language website
 RATP's interactive map of the RER
 RATP's interactive map of the Paris métro

French 
 RATP official website
 Mobidf website, dedicated to the RER (unofficial) 
 Metro-Pole website, dedicated to Paris public transports (unofficial)

D, RER D
Railway lines opened in 1987
1987 establishments in France